Orto-Surt (Orto Suurt) is a rural locality (a selo), the only inhabited locality, and the administrative center of Maganinsky Rural Okrug of Gorny District in the Sakha Republic, Russia, located  from Berdigestyakh, the administrative center of the district. Its population as of the 2010 Census was 536, up from 516 as recorded during the 2002 Census.

References

Notes

Sources
Official website of the Sakha Republic. Registry of the Administrative-Territorial Divisions of the Sakha Republic. Gorny District 

Rural localities in Gorny District